Bradstreet is a surname. Notable people with the surname include:

 Anne Bradstreet, early American writer of Puritan prose and poetry
 Jeff Bradstreet, American physician and founder of the Good News Doctor Foundation
 John Bradstreet, British officer in the French and Indian War
 Simon Bradstreet, husband of Anne and governor of the Massachusetts Bay Colony from 1679 to 1686
 Tim Bradstreet, American artist and commercial illustrator
 James Bradstreet Greenough, American classical scholar

Fictional characters:
 Inspector Bradstreet, a fictional police officer appearing in Arthur Conan Doyle's Sherlock Holmes novels

See also
 Bradstreet Observatory of Eastern University in St. Davids, Pennsylvania
 Dun & Bradstreet, a company providing business information and known for its Data Universal Numbering System
 David Bradstreet - Canadian Singer-Songwriter